The first 19 locomotives ordered by Isambard Kingdom Brunel for the Great Western Railway included six 2-2-2 Charles Tayleur locomotives. They were built by Charles Tayleur and Company, which became later the Vulcan Foundry. The locomotives were unsuccessful and rapidly supplemented by the Star Class locomotives ordered by Daniel Gooch once he had been appointed as the Locomotive Engineer.

14-inch cylinder locomotives

 Vulcan (Tayleur 51; 1837–1868)
This locomotive was the first to run on the Great Western Railway when it was tested on 28 December 1837 from its shed at West Drayton. It was withdrawn in 1843 but was rebuilt as a 2-2-2T tank locomotive and returned to service in 1846, running in this form until 1868. It survived for two more years at Reading as a stationary boiler. It is named after the workshops where it was built, which themselves were named after the Roman god of fire.
 Æolus (Tayleur 52; 1837–1867)
This locomotive worked the first train on the Great Western Railway when it opened on 4 June 1838. In 1843 it was fitted with more conventional  driving and  carrying wheels with  cylinders; at some time it was converted to a 2-2-2T tank locomotive. Named for Aeolus, Greek ruler of the winds.  
 Bacchus (Tayleur 53; 1837–1842)
The name was later carried by a Pyracmon Class goods locomotive. Named for Bacchus, Roman god of  wine-making.

12-inch cylinder locomotives

 Apollo (Tayleur 62; 1838–1867)
This locomotive was rebuilt in 1839 with new cylinders  and was altered to become a 2-2-2T before it ceased work in 1867. Named for Apollo, Greek and Roman god of the sun. 
 Neptune (Tayleur 63; 1838–1840)
The name was later carried by one of the Ariadne Class standard goods locomotives. Named for Neptune, Roman god of the sea.
 Venus (Tayleur 64; 1838–1870)
This locomotive was withdrawn in 1843 but was rebuilt and returned to service in 1846. It now had  driving and  carrying wheels, with  cylinders; at some time it was also converted to run as a 2-2-2T tank locomotive. Named for Venus, Roman goddess of  love and fertility. The name was also carried by a Firefly Class locomotive from 1841.

References

Sources
 
 

Charles Tayleur
Broad gauge (7 feet) railway locomotives
2-2-2 locomotives
Early steam locomotives
Vulcan Foundry locomotives
Steam locomotives of Great Britain
Railway locomotives introduced in 1837
Scrapped locomotives